James Mills Storehouse, also known as the Old Tobacco Warehouse, is a historic store located at Urbanna, Middlesex County, Virginia. It was built between 1763 and 1767, and is a 1 1/2-story, rectangular brick structure on a raised brick basement.  It has a gable roof and full width front porch. It is a rare if not unique survivor of the type of storehouse which, being run by a resident factor of a British company, was not only connected with the sale of tobacco but which housed imported goods to be bought on credit by the planters.

It was listed on the National Register of Historic Places in 1972.

References

External links
 Tobacco Warehouse, State Route 1002, Urbanna, Middlesex County, VA at the Historic American Buildings Survey (HABS)

Commercial buildings on the National Register of Historic Places in Virginia
Commercial buildings completed in 1767
Buildings and structures in Middlesex County, Virginia
National Register of Historic Places in Middlesex County, Virginia
Historic American Buildings Survey in Virginia
Individually listed contributing properties to historic districts on the National Register in Virginia
1767 establishments in Virginia
Tobacco buildings in the United States